The Pariser Einzugsmarsch ("Paris Entry-March") (Armeemarschsammlung AM II, 38) is a well-known German military march composed by Johann Heinrich Walch during the Napoleonic Wars.

History
The piece was probably already well known around 1800 in Frankfurt am Main. On 31 March 1814, it was played in the presence of Emperor Francis I of Austria, Tsar Alexander I, and King Friedrich Wilhelm III during the expedition of the allied troops in Paris at the end of the War of the Sixth Coalition.

Due to its title, the march became popular during the time of the German Empire. In addition, still later during the Weimar Republic and later in the Third Reich, it was a popular symbol of Franco-German enmity.

In 1940, after the victory of the German armed forces over France, the march was played, as in 1814, during the formal entry of the German troops into Paris. Abroad, it is particularly popular in Russia, where it has formed part of the traditional repertoire of the country's military music since 1814.

See also
Königgrätzer Marsch
Yorckscher Marsch
Der Hohenfriedberger
Alte Kameraden
Badenweiler Marsch

External links

 Pariser Einzugsmarsch (1814)
 Pariser Einzugsmarsch by Walch

German military marches
1800s songs